Parafurnishius is an extinct genus of conodont in the family Ellisoniidae.

The type species, P. xuanhanensis, has been described by Yang et al in 2014 in the Early Triassic (Induan) Feixianguan Formation of northeastern Sichuan Province, Southwest China.

References

External links 

Prioniodinida genera
Early Triassic fish
Triassic conodonts
Fossils of China
Triassic fish of Asia